Sègre was a province of the First French Empire

Geography
The province of Sègre was mostly in what is now modern Spain or more precisely Catalonia although it included parts of what is now France

See also
Bouches-del'Èbre

Subdivisions of the First French Empire